Caroline Anne Crowley (born 23 May 1964) is an Irish actress, Gaeilgeoir and former radio and television presenter.

She appeared on television shows such as The Morbegs and Echo Island for Raidió Teilifís Éireann (RTÉ). She also had her own chat show, Limelight, and co-presented Eurovision Song Contest 1997 with Ronan Keating. More recently she has had acting roles in shows such as The Clinic, School Run and An Crisis. She appeared as the character Jackie Ferguson in the RTÉ soap opera Fair City. She has also appeared as Ellisef in the first two seasons of the TV series Vikings.

Early life
Crowley was born and raised in Waterford, Ireland. Her mother Nodhlaig (originally from The Rosses, County Donegal) was a teacher and her father Con (originally from Cork) was a garda, while she also has one sister, Bríd. She first went on stage in a local production of Oliver!. She graduated with a B.Ed. from St. Patricks College, Drumcondra.

Broadcasting career
Before she began a career in television, Crowley was a primary school teacher.

Crowley began her broadcasting career on local radio in her home city of Waterford on WLR FM and presented several different shows between 1991 and 1996 before moving to RTÉ. She started out in children's programming, co-presenting the Irish language versions of Echo Island with comedian Dara Ó Briain, and starring in the pre-school series The Morbegs as the character Liodain.

In 1997, Crowley was offered the role as presenter of the Eurovision Song Contest 1997 (hosted by RTÉ) with Ronan Keating. She also appeared before the Eurovision Song Contest in 1998, speaking to Terry Wogan and wishing him and Ulrika Jonsson well before they started presenting the show.

After presenting the Eurovision, Crowley became one of the biggest stars on RTÉ in the 1990s. According to her this was a major problem at the time, she was working on several shows on RTÉ. She presented Potluck Mondays to Fridays at 5:30, on a Thursday night she had her own health show called Pulse and on Sundays she had her own prime-time chat show called Limelight. Limelight ran for two seasons.

She later left television presenting to return to radio presenting, co-presenting Fandango with Ray D'Arcy on RTÉ Radio 1. She appeared on RTÉ Radio 1 every Sunday night.

Crowley has since distanced herself from her RTÉ career, describing herself as an "accidental tourist" at the station.

Acting career
In 2008 she appeared in the TG4 drama The Running Mate and TV3's School Run in 2009. She appeared in The Clinic also in 2009. She has starred in Irish language short films including An Gaeilgeoir Nocht and has appeared in an episode of the Irish language television series An Crisis. She is currently working on a new drama series for TG4 called Anseo. In 2010 she teamed up with actors, Sorcha Fox, Jamie Carswell, writer/director Dónal O'Kelly and Kíla to work on a play called The Adventures of the Wet Senor. From October 2014 to 2018 she appeared as a cast member in Fair City. In 2022, she appeared in An Cailín Ciúin, an Irish-language drama film, and was nominated for a Best Supporting Actress IFTA.

See also
 List of Eurovision Song Contest presenters

References

External links

1964 births
Living people
Echo Island presenters
Irish film actresses
Irish radio presenters
Irish schoolteachers
Irish stage actresses
Irish television actresses
People from Waterford (city)
RTÉ television presenters
Irish women radio presenters
Irish women television presenters
Alumni of St Patrick's College, Dublin